Macolla is a Nicaraguan salsa band. From 1992 to 1996, the lead singer was Lya Barrioz. During this period Macolla recorded two CDs, Sueños (Dreams) and Bailarlo Contigo (Dance it with you, 1996), for Sony Music label. The band and Barrioz also made the first music video shot in film format in Nicaragua - "Sólo Soy".

Macolla was one of the most popular bands in Nicaragua in the 1990s. Their best-selling album Bailarlo Contigo (Sony, 1996) featured several songs in palo de mayo style showing the genre's creative development - including a remake of an old palo de mayo song but with English-Spanish chorus a Spanish rap section. A medley "Homenaje a La Música Latina" has featured on several Rough Guide compilations including The Rough Guide To Salsa, and Rough Guide To World Music for Children.

Discography
Bailarlo Contigo (Sony, 1996)
Machaina, written D.A.R. (cover of "Oh Madiana" -Kassav Band)
Anancy Oh
Do Me Amas D.A.R.
El Que No Corre Vuela Manuel Jimenez
Nos Quedamos Tu y Yo Jorge Luís Piloto
Bailarlo Contigo Traditional
Esclavo de Amor Rey Sanchez
Será Que Ya No Puedo Olvidarte Rudy Pérez
Esa Mujer
Ma' Yo Bailo

References

Nicaraguan musicians
Salsa music groups